Georg Statz (1894–1945) was a school teacher and taxonomist who published widely on fossil insects from the Oligocene Rott Formation of Germany. Known as the "Statz Collection", his fossils are reposited at the Natural History Museum of Los Angeles County and the Institüt fur Paläontologie, Universität Bonn.

References 

1894 births
1945 deaths
German taxonomists